Hidallana (also transcribed Hiddellana, Hidellana, Hidallana or in other ways) is a town in the Sabaragamuwa Province of Sri Lanka, located at latitude: 6°42'57.96", longitude: 80°22'46.2" near Ratnapura. The estimated mean elevation above sea level is 82 metres. The postal code is 70012.

References 

Populated places in Sabaragamuwa Province